Mictopsichia benevides is a species of moth of the family Tortricidae. It is found in Brazil.

Description
The wingspan is about 10.5 mm. The ground colour of the forewings is brownish orange, but orange yellow along the costa postbasally and submedially. It is suffused olive brown along the edges of markings. The hindwings are orange below.

Etymology
The name refers to the type locality, Benevides, Pará, Brazil.

References

Moths described in 2009
Mictopsichia
Moths of South America
Taxa named by Józef Razowski